Karl Edmond De Vere Wallinger (born 19 October 1957, Prestatyn, Wales) is a Welsh musician, songwriter and record producer. He is best known for leading the band World Party and for his mid-1980s stint in the Waterboys. He also wrote and originally released the song "She's the One", which was later covered by Robbie Williams and became a hit single.

Wallinger is a multi-instrumentalist, enabling him to demo and record the bulk of World Party material as a one-man band. Although he is right-handed, he plays a right-handed guitar upside-down and left-handed.

Early life and early musical work
Wallinger was born in Prestatyn, Wales, and spent his early childhood there, but was educated at Charterhouse (a public school in Surrey). From a young age, he was immersed in the music of the Beatles, the Beach Boys, Bob Dylan and Love. Echoes of these childhood heroes permeated the records he was to release himself 33 years later.

Wallinger's musical career began in Prestatyn in 1977 as a keyboard player with Pax, before forming the short-lived band Quasimodo with Dave Sharp and Nigel Twist (who both went on to be in the Alarm). He then had a brief job in music publishing, after which he became musical director of The Rocky Horror Show.

The Waterboys (1983-1985)
Wallinger was recruited into Mike Scott's band the Waterboys as a keyboard player in 1983, initially touring the first album and contributing to the two following albums (A Pagan Place and This Is the Sea), as well as playing on subsequent live tours. Though he was initially hired to play piano and organ (and to sing occasional backing vocals), his multi-instrumental and production skills impressed Scott and ensured that he played a far greater role on This Is the Sea than he had on the previous album, significantly contributing to the band's 'Big Music' sound. While Scott concentrated on Steve Reichian orchestrations of the songs using multitracked pianos and guitar, Wallinger fleshed out the material with a variety of synthesised orchestrations, synth bass and percussion instruments. Wallinger also wrote the original music for "Don't Bang the Drum" (the opening track for This Is the Sea). Aware that his own musical ambitions would bring him into conflict with Scott, he opted to leave the Waterboys in late 1985 towards the end of their 'This Is the Sea' tour (he was replaced as keyboard player by Guy Chambers, his future collaborator).

While working on solo material, Wallinger also worked on Sinéad O'Connor's 1987 debut album The Lion and the Cobra. O'Connor returned the favour by singing some backing vocals on the first two World Party albums.

World Party (1986–present)
Wallinger's first release under the World Party banner, Private Revolution (1986), was a combination of folk, funk and soul. Its title was a nod to its creation by Wallinger working alone in a home recording studio. It spawned a hit single in "Ship of Fools". Various musical colleagues from former projects contributed to the recordings, including Waterboys saxophonist Anthony Thistlethwaite, Sinéad O'Connor (singing backing vocals on "Hawaiian Island World") and the mysterious Delahaye (possibly Wallinger himself or Mike Scott).

World Party has gone on to release four more well-received albums – Goodbye Jumbo (1990), Bang! (1993), Egyptology (1997) and Dumbing Up (2000). In 2007, Wallinger released Best in Show, a best-of album covering tracks from the studio albums.

Soundtracking, other songwriting and collaborations
Wallinger was musical director for the 1994 film Reality Bites, and contributed to the soundtrack of Clueless in 1995. The Wallinger-penned "She's the One" (originally a World Party song) has been successfully covered by Robbie Williams. Wallinger has also acted as a member of Bob Geldof's backing band.

1997 saw two tracks by Wallinger included on a compilation album titled Now and in Time to Be, a musical celebration of the works of famed Irish poet W. B. Yeats. The poem "Politics" is credited as having been interpreted by Wallinger, while World Party is acknowledged as a contributing artist for "The Four Ages of Man".

In 2008, after almost 18 years in the making, the album Big Blue Ball was released, co-produced with Peter Gabriel and Stephen Hague. The album collects songs written and recorded during the summers of 1991, 1992 and 1995 by several artists from different countries. Among them are the French duo, Deep Forest, and the Irish singer, Sinéad O'Connor.

Personal life
He is married to sculptor Suzie Zamit, and they have two children. Their daughter Nancy is a founding member of the comedy troupe Mischief Theatre.

In an interview with Chicago Tribune freelancer Jay Hedblade, Wallinger revealed that he suffered a brain aneurysm in February 2001. After several months of writing for the band, he felt unwell, and asked his friends to call an ambulance. He was taken to the hospital and was diagnosed with a brain aneurysm. This led him to require surgery wherein the surgeons had to block a nerve near the optic nerve. Despite what would appear to be a full recovery, he lost his peripheral vision on the left side of both eyes. Although the aneurysm meant that he had to suspend all work for nearly five years, he eventually resumed touring in 2006.

References
BBC Radio 4 Extra – Loose Ends with Clive Anderson – 15 October 2012. Source of information – Karl Wallinger himself

1957 births
Living people
The Waterboys members
Welsh singer-songwriters
Welsh multi-instrumentalists
Welsh record producers
People from Prestatyn
People educated at Charterhouse School
World Party members